Moraine is rock debris transported by glaciers.

Moraine may also refer to:

Places
Moraine, Ohio, a city in Ohio, USA
Moraine Lake, a lake in Banff National Park, Canada
Moraine State Park, in Pennsylvania
Moraine Township, Lake County, Illinois, a township in Lake County, Illinois, USA

Other uses
Moiraine Damodred, one of the main characters of The Wheel of Time fantasy series
Moraine Valley Community College, a community college in Palos Hills, Illinois